Kurukshetra is a 2000 Indian action drama film written and directed by Mahesh Manjrekar. It released on 10 November 2000 and stars Sanjay Dutt, Mahima Chaudhry and Om Puri in lead roles with Mukesh Rishi and Shivaji Satam in supporting roles.

Plot
ACP Prithviraj Singh is an honest and brave police officer. All dishonest police officers, rogues, criminals and corrupt politicians are scared of him. The day he joins duty in Mumbai, he destroys all the illegal business of Iqbal Pasina. From that day onwards, Iqbal Pasina starts admiring Prithviraj.

In his personal life, Prithviraj lives with his wife, Anjali  and sister, Aarti. Aarti is in love with Sub-Inspector Avinash. Anjali is sad because  "Prithvi", who once used to love her a lot, is now a totally different man, a man of law and duties. She lost her lover to  the uniform.

One day, a tycoon smuggler and ringleader, Baburao Deshmukh's son Ambar and his friend Rohit, trap a girl named Gita Naik in a hotel room, and both of them rape her.

This brutal incident provokes the battle of "Kurukshetra".

The battle is fought between  Baburao and Prithviraj . Babu Rao Deshmukh  has money, power and government infrastructure, and  Prithvi Raj Singh gets the support from opposition leader Sambhaji Yadav and Iqbal Pasina.

Sambhaji Yadav later betrays Prithviraj and joins hands with the Baburao. Finally, Prithviraj realizes that the law is helpless and kills both Baburao and Sambhaji Yadav to avenge the perpetrators of the rape incident and bring Justice.

Cast

 Sanjay Dutt as ACP Prithviraj Singh
 Mahima Chaudhry as Anjali Singh
 Om Puri as Chief Minister Baburao Deshmukh
 Mukesh Rishi as Iqbal Pasina 
 Shivaji Satam as Sambhaji Yadav
 Rakhi Sawant as Geeta Naik
 Tina Rana as Aarti Singh
 Salil Ankola as Sub-Inspector Avinash
 Pramod Moutho as ACP Patwardhan 
 Ganesh Yadav as Ambar B. Deshmukh
 Sayaji Shinde as Constable Gopinath Survey Patil "Gopi"
 Mahesh Anand as Anna Pillai
 Rajat Sharma as himself (guest appearance)
 Sukhwinder Singh as a special appearance in song "Banthan"
 Kashmera Shah as item number "Banthan"
 Suman Ranganathan as item number "Nahi Milega Aisa Ghaghra"

Music

The music is composed by Himesh Reshammiya.

Reception  
Taran Adarsh wrote "On the whole, KURUKSHETRA is an engrossing good versus evil film that has all the masala to appeal to the masses ? winning performances, bravura dialogues and ample doses of action". Sharmila Taliculam of Rediff.com opined that "The violence is non-stop, unremitting, and at times, overdone to the point where you find yourself wishing it would end". Fultoo of Idlebrain.com said that the film "Could be missed".

References

External links

2000 films
2000s Hindi-language films
2000s crime action films
2000 action drama films
Films directed by Mahesh Manjrekar
Films scored by Himesh Reshammiya
Fictional portrayals of the Maharashtra Police
2000s masala films
Indian crime action films
Films shot in Mumbai
Films shot in Switzerland
Indian police films
Indian films about revenge
Indian vigilante films
2000s vigilante films
Films about rape in India
Films about police officers
Indian action drama films